The Three Graces, also known as  Carytid Fountain Group, Friendship Fountain, The Three Bares, and Three Bares Fountain, is an outdoor fountain and sculpture by Gertrude Vanderbilt Whitney, installed in 1931 at Montreal's McGill University, in Quebec, Canada.

Description and history
Whitney's caryatid figure dated back to 1913 when she won an award for it at the Paris Salon and from the National Association of Women Painters and Sculptors. It had been modeled for the Arlington Hotel in Washington, D.C. The original hotel was demolished in 1912 to make room for a larger hotel, that was to include Whitney's caryatid, but its funding fell through and it was never built.  The figure was exhibited at the  Panama–Pacific International Exposition in San Francisco in 1915, and a bronze version of it was erected in Lima, Peru in 1924. At the time of the fountain's unveiling, it was draped in a Union Jack and the Stars and Stripes, Whitney, in poor health and in mourning over the death of her husband Harry Payne Whitney, did not attend. She also missed the unveiling of her Titanic Memorial in Washington D.C. three days before.

See also

 1931 in art

References

External links
 

1931 establishments in Canada
1931 sculptures
Fountains in Canada
McGill University
Outdoor sculptures in Montreal
Sculptures of men in Canada
Statues in Canada
Sculptures by Gertrude Vanderbilt Whitney